James Robert Farris (born April 13, 1978) is a former American football wide receiver who retired from the National Football League (NFL) in 2009. He was an unsuccessful candidate for the United States Congress in 2012.

Early years
Farris attended Lewiston High School in Lewiston, Idaho, and was a letterman in football, basketball, and track. In football, Farris helped in leading his team to their first Idaho High School Football State Championship as a sophomore, and as a senior, to the State Football Championship Game and finished his senior season with 78 receptions for 1,510 yards and 18 touchdowns. In basketball, he was named the team's most valuable player as a senior.

College
Farris attended the University of Montana, where he was a four-year letterman and All-American for the Montana Grizzlies, leading them to the National Championship game in 2000. His game-winning catch in the semi-final game against Appalachian State sent the "Griz" to their third championship game appearance in six years.

NFL career
He was signed by the San Francisco 49ers as an undrafted free agent in 2001. Farris has also been a member of the New England Patriots, Atlanta Falcons, Washington Redskins and Jacksonville Jaguars.

He has worked for Comcast Sports Southeast as a host and analyst on Sportsnite, as well as host his own NFL Fantasy Football web show called Side:Line with Jimmy Farris. Farris currently works as a guest NFL analyst on CBS46 in Atlanta, GA.

Political career
In 2012 Farris was the Democratic candidate for the United States House of Representatives in Idaho's 1st congressional district, running against the incumbent, Republican Raúl Labrador. He defeated Cynthia Clinkingbeard in the Democratic Party primary on May 15.
Labrador won the general election, 63% to 30.8%.

Farris was a candidate for an open Idaho House of Representatives seat in the Garden City-based District 16 in 2014, but was defeated in the Democratic primary by teacher and activist John McCrostie.

References

External links
Jimmy Farris for Congress
NFL Bio
New England Patriots Bio

1978 births
Living people
People from Lewiston, Idaho
Players of American football from Idaho
American football wide receivers
Montana Grizzlies football players
San Francisco 49ers players
New England Patriots players
Atlanta Falcons players
Washington Redskins players
Jacksonville Jaguars players
Candidates in the 2012 United States elections
21st-century American politicians
Idaho Democrats
American athlete-politicians